Wadi Hunayn was a Palestinian Arab village in the Ramle Subdistrict, located 9 km west of Ramla. According to a local tradition, it was named after the Yemeni home of the Qada'a tribe who settled here in the early Islamic period.

History
In 1881, it was noted as being named Wady Hanein, meaning "The valley of Hanein" (or Honein); the word means the cry of a she-camel to her colt.

British Mandate era
At the time of the 1922 census of Palestine, Wadi Hunayn had a population of 195 inhabitants, all Muslims, which increased to 278 Muslims and 2 Christians, living in 55 houses, by the 1931 census. 

In the 1945 statistics, there were 1,620 Muslims and 1,760 Jews estimated to live in Wadi Hunayn and Ness Ziona together.

Its main export was citrus, grown in orchards that were irrigated by numerous water wells dug around the village. The residents worked in the orchards and sold their yield at the cities. They grew bananas and grains as well. During the 1940s, the village became a main source of basic supplies and meat for the nearby Jewish and Palestinian inhabitants due to its strategic location on the main road.

1948, aftermath
The village was depopulated during the 1947–48 Civil War in Mandatory Palestine. The majority of the inhabitants fled the village during January 1948, with the remaining population being transported into Jordan by the Haganah who entered the village on 19 April 1948. Wadi Hunayn was mostly destroyed by the Haganah forces, who blew up all the buildings near the main road as well as the local mosque's minaret, since the village was used as a launching point for Arab attacks on Jewish convoys to Jerusalem. Only a few of the original houses of the village remained, while the mosque (built in 1934) was converted into a synagogue by the neighboring Jewish population of Ness Ziona and renamed "Geulat Yisra'el" ("Israel's salvation").

People from Wadi Hunayn
Nuzha Al-Ghussein

References

Bibliography

External links
Welcome To Wadi Hunayn
Wadi Hunayn,  on Zochrot
Survey of Western Palestine, Map 13: IAA,  Wikimedia commons
Wadi Hunayn, from the Khalil Sakakini Cultural Center

Arab villages depopulated during the 1948 Arab–Israeli War
District of Ramla